Mustached Nanny is a 1977 Soviet comedy film, feature film directorial debut of Vladimir Grammatikov. The film was a box-office hit, it was seen by 47 million viewers in 1979.

Plot
Jokester Kesha Chetvergov (Sergei Prokhanov), after graduating from school, is not able to find interesting work for himself. He did not get a higher education and failed to stay at any job for longer than two weeks. Most of his time he spends by messing around with his immature friends Bublik (Valery Kislenko), Motyl (Felix Krol) and Ponchik (Sergey Bachursky).

Eventually, the district policeman Yevseyev (Vadim Aleksandrov), who previously sympathized with the guy and helped him with finding work, finally loses his patience and calls Innokenty to a meeting of the committee of lay judges at the Housing Committee, where his fate is to be decided.

The public is determined to take serious measures against the young man as a parasite, but kindergarten director Marina Borisovna Mikhalchuk (Lyudmila Shagalova) stands up for him.

Marina Borisovna convinces the assessors to give Chetvergov another chance to correct his behavior and employs Kesha in her kindergarten as a night shift nanny.

Cast
Sergei Prokhanov as Innokenty Petrovich Chetvergov (Kesha)
Lyudmila Shagalova as Marina Borisovna Mikhalchuk, director of the kindergarten
Elizaveta Uvarova as Arina Rodionovna, nurse

Friends of Kesha

Sergey Bachursky as Petya  
Valery Kislenko as Dima  
Felix Krol as Vasya

Members of the Commission on difficult adolescents

Valentin Bryleev as fellow activist
Gennady Yalovich as father of Kuroslepov
Arsen Berzin as comrade-in-arms watching TV
Bronislava Zakharova as red-haired woman activist
Tatyana Nikolaeva as female activist in a police uniform
Vadim Uryupin as red-haired male activist

Others

Vadim Aleksandrov as precinct officer Yevseyev
Nadezhda Samsonova as smart old woman
Alexander Sazhin as watchman of Kuzya
Marina Matveenko as stranger
Natalya Khorokhorina as mother of  Barmaleychik 
Vladimir Puchkov
Olga Grigoryeva
Klavdia Kozlenkova as Maria Stepanovna, the janitor
Leonid Trutnev as taxi driver

References

External links

Soviet musical comedy films
1970s musical comedy films
1977 directorial debut films
Gorky Film Studio films
1977 comedy films
1977 films